Album No. 8 is the eighth studio album by Georgian-British singer-songwriter Katie Melua. The album was released by BMG on 16 October 2020. The first single from the album, "A Love like That", was produced by Leo Abrahams and had its premiere on BBC Radio 2 on 30 June 2020. The second single, "Airtime", premiered on 24 July 2020.

Background
Melua started writing and recording the album when she was in the process of separating from her estranged husband, World Superbike racer James Toseland. “We are both perfectionists,” Melua stated. “So we both really wanted to ‘get it right’. But in the end, I think we both accepted it was over and decided to perfect the art of letting go. I looked to nature for support and saw the falling leaves as part of a beautiful cycle."

Critical reception

Album No. 8 was met with universal acclaim from music critics. At Metacritic, which assigns a normalised rating out of 100 to reviews from professional critics, the album received a weighted average score of 82, based on four reviews.

Track listing
Track listing adapted from Apple Music. Credits adapted from Spotify metadata. All music is composed by Leo Abrahams.

Charts

Weekly charts

Year-end charts

References

2020 albums
Katie Melua albums
albums produced by Leo Abrahams